The Kalamunda Zig Zag was a zig zag rail line that was part of the Upper Darling Range Railway line in Western Australia, opening in July 1891 and closing in July 1949. Most of it was converted to a public road in 1952, part of which is now a tourist drive called Zig Zag Scenic Drive that offers views of Perth from the hills.

History

The Kalamunda Zig Zag was completed in July 1891, as part of the Upper Darling Range Railway line in Western Australia which was built by the Canning Jarrah Timber Company from a junction with the Midland line at Midland Junction to Canning Mills to transport railway sleepers to Perth's growing railway system. On 1 July 1903, the line was taken over by the Western Australian Government Railways. To overcome a steep gradient up the Darling Scarp, a zig zag was built between Ridge Hill and Gooseberry Hill stations, being cheaper to build than a continuous gradient line. The Kalamunda Zig Zag closed on 22 July 1949 along with the rest of the line. In 1952 the track was removed and most of the Kalamunda Zig Zag converted into a narrow bitumen road. 

This section of road was closed to motor vehicles completely by the City of Kalamunda in May 2020 due to reports of anti-social behaviour at night including hooning, drug use and cruelty to wildlife. After more than 12 months of closure, the road reopened in July 2021 on a 12 month trial basis, with motor vehicle access limited to between 11am and 8:30pm. In May 2022, City of Kalamunda councillors voted to keep the road open permanently with the night and early morning motor vehicle curfew to continue, despite concerns about the ongoing cost to do so.

Sections
The sections of the railway that made up the zig zag were:
Ridge Hill (lower section of Kalamunda Zig Zag)
Number 1 Points
Number 2 Points Statham's Quarry known also as Perth City Council Siding from 1920
Number 3 Points
Number 4 Points (upper section of Kalamunda Zig Zag)

The gradient is as steep as 1 in 27 with an average of 1 in 38.

Events
Every year the City of Kalamunda holds a "Zig Zag Walk" event, in which the zig zag section is closed to all but pedestrians, providing people with the opportunity to admire the views and see the area's wildflowers; Zig Zag Scenic Drive is a part of the Darling Range Regional Park. The Zig Zag Walk occurs around early October every year. On the last Sunday of October each year, there is a community arts festival called the "Zig Zag Festival" held in Stirk Park, Kalamunda.

The zig zag is also used as a stage in the Targa West Rally. The road is closed to all traffic and the stage is run in reverse road direction, from the bottom to the top.

References

Further reading

External links

Zig Zag Community Arts Festival page

Closed railway lines in Western Australia
Gooseberry Hill, Western Australia
Railway lines opened in 1891
Railway lines closed in 1949
Railways with Zig Zags
Roads in Perth, Western Australia